Pokharan may refer to:

 Pokhran, a city in Rajasthan, India
 Pokharan, Dahanu, a village in Maharashtra, India
 Bade Pokharan, a village in Maharashtra, India